This is a list of awards and nominations received by TVXQ, a South Korean pop group produced by SM Entertainment.


Awards and nominations

Other recognitions

Listicles

Notes

See also
TVXQ albums discography
TVXQ singles discography
TVXQ videography
List of songs recorded by TVXQ

References

External links

 Official Korean website
 Official Japanese website

TVXQ
TVXQ